Gluconacetobacter liquefaciens is a bacterium in the family Acetobacteraceae. It infects plants and is responsible for spoilage in wine and beer made with such infected plants. In July 2022, the microbe was detected in certain magnesium citrate solutions that are sold as part of the preparatory procedure for colonoscopies and other proctological procedures, resulting in product recalls.

References 

Rhodospirillales